A Semblance of Normality is the eleventh studio album by the British folk metal band Skyclad, released in the year 2004. It is the first "new" album the band recorded with Kevin Ridley as vocalist since this album's predecessor No Daylights... Nor Heel Taps.

With this album Skyclad returned to a more heavy and experimental style, though their "classic hard rock" influences are very obvious on this release. It can be compared to the band's mid-1990s albums.

Several tracks on this album feature 14 musicians of The Royal Philharmonic Orchestra.

Track listing

2004 albums
Skyclad (band) albums
Albums produced by Kevin Ridley